William "Bill" Appleyard (birth unknown – death unknown) was a professional rugby league footballer who played in the 1890s. He played at representative level for Yorkshire, and at club level for Wakefield Trinity (Heritage № 35), as a forward (prior to the specialist positions of), during the era of contested scrums.

Playing career
William Appleyard made his début for Wakefield Trinity during December 1895, and he played his last match for Wakefield Trinity during the 1898–99 season.

County honours
William Appleyard won cap(s) for Yorkshire while at Wakefield Trinity.

References

External links
Search for "Appleyard" at rugbyleagueproject.org

English rugby league players
Place of birth missing
Place of death missing
Rugby league forwards
Wakefield Trinity players
Year of birth missing
Year of death missing
Yorkshire rugby league team players